An antariya is a lower body garment from ancient India. It is a long white or coloured strip of cotton passed through the legs, tucked at the back and covering the legs loosely, then flowing into long pleats at front of the legs.

History 
Antriya is an ancient garment mentioned in the Ramayana and Mahabharata. Hindu deities can be seen wearing Uttariya and Antariya in sculpture in the Indian subcontinent, especially in hindu templess and in images in desi calendars.

As mentioned in Buddhist Pali literature during the 6th century BC, Sari   is an evolved form of Antriya, which was one of three-piece attire worn by women during the ancient period.

Terminology 
The Sanskrit word for Antriya is Antarīya. Lower garment of the ladies of the period are variously referred to as ambara , amsuka , antariya , nivasana , paridhana , vasana , vastram , vasas and sauli in the texts.

Use 
Antariya was usually made of fine cotton or silk. It was usually used in combination with the uttariya.

Gallery

See also 

 Aprapadina
 Uttariya
 Sari
Choli
 Nivi (garment)

References

Indian clothing
Hindu religious clothing